, or formerly Nissan zaibatsu, was one of Japan's most powerful business groupings.

Founded in 1928 by Yoshisuke Aikawa, the group was originally a holding company created as an offshoot of Kuhara Mining Co. (became Nippon Mining & Metals Company; currently part of JXTG Holdings), which Aikawa had taken over as president of from his brother-in-law, Fusanosuke Kuhara.

The group's core business was real estate and insurance with hundreds of member companies, including fisheries, mining companies, and was affiliated with Hitachi Group companies, as well as what Nissan is now known for—its automobile business.  After World War II, the zaibatsu was disbanded, and reformed into Nichiyo-kai, otherwise known as Nissan Group.

Although the Nissan name was primarily known for its car manufacturing outside Japan, Nissan Motors was a comparatively small side business compared to its core real estate business until the real estate crash of the early 1990s (see Japanese asset price bubble).  Like the similar subprime crisis, the crash dealt a devastating blow to the Nissan Group by leaving it with several hundred billions of dollars of debt.

The Nissan Group has long since shed the majority of its real estate assets (which were sold to Mitsui & Co. and still operates as the Bussan Real Estate Company), and has focused on manufacturing and insurance. Nissan Motors was given more independence as French automotive manufacturer Renault bought a 38.8% stake in the company for $5.4 billion in 1999 and appointed Carlos Ghosn as CEO of the new Renault–Nissan Alliance. Nissan Motors' successful turnaround was attributed to CEO Ghosn's ability to detach it from its keiretsu connections and eliminate 23,000 jobs from the Japanese workforce.

Nissan Concern member companies

 Nissan Subgroup
 日産自動車 Nissan Motors
 日産化学工業 Nissan Chemical Corporation
 日産証券 Nissan Securities
 日産農林 NNK
 Kinugawa Rubber Industrial Company
 Kayaba Industry
 Hitachi Group
 Hitachi, Ltd
 INES Corporation
 Hitachi Maxell
 Nisseicom Limited
 日立キャピタル株式会社 Hitachi Capital
 日立金属 Hitachi Metals
 Hitachi Cable
 日立化成工業株式会社 Hitachi Chemical
 新神戸電機株式会社 Shin-Kobe Electric Machinery Company
 株式会社ニチレイ Nichirei Corporation
 Hitachi Zosen Corporation
 日立建機株式会社 Hitachi Construction Machinery
 TCM株式会社 TCM Corp
 Nippon Suisan Kaisha
 日油株式会社 NOF Corporation
 ニッサン石鹸株式会社 Nissan Soap Company
 昭和炭酸株式会社 Showa Tansan Company, Limited
 りんかい日産建設 Rinkai Nissan Construction
 JXTG Group
 JXTGホールディングス株式会社 JXTG Holdings Incorporated
 JXTG Nippon Oil & Energy
 JX金属株式会社 JX Nippon Mining & Metals Company
 Sompo Holdings (formerly Yasuda Fire & Marine Insurance Company)
 Sompo Japan Nipponkoa Insurance
 日産センチュリー証券 Nissan Century Security Company, Limited
 兼松日産農林株式会社 Kanematsu-NNK Corporation

Former members
 Victor Company of Japan or JVC, sold to Panasonic in 1953, spun-off as an independent; merged into Kenwood Corporation to create JVCKenwood Corp.
 Nippon Columbia - founded in 1910 and divested from Nissan Group in 2002
 Denon - founded 1910 and merged with Marantz Japan Incorporated in 2002 to form D&M Holdings
 Nissan Mutual Life Insurance - founded in 1909 and bankrupt in 1997
 Nitto Denko - founded 1918
 Nissan Diesel - sold to Volvo in 2010
 Nissan Marine (Merged into Tohatsu in 2014)
 Nissan Outboard Motors (Merged into Tohatsu in 2014)

See also
 Yasuda zaibatsu

Nissan
Conglomerate companies based in Tokyo
Keiretsu
Zaibatsu
Conglomerate companies established in 1928
Japanese companies established in 1928
Financial services companies established in 1928
Real estate companies established in 1928